Pajulahti Cup was an annual ice hockey tournament held in Pajulahti Sports Institute, Finland. Most of the teams participating this event were Russian.

Pajulahti Cup winners 

International ice hockey competitions hosted by Finland